MIV or variation, may refer to:

The Roman numerals for 1004
 The year AD 1004 CE
 A number in the 1000s range
Moscow Institute of Oriental Studies
Amdang language (ISO 639 language code: miv)
Millville Municipal Airport (IATA airport code MIV), New Jersey, USA
Mechanised Infantry Vehicle, a planned armoured personnel carrier for the British Army
, a ship of the Royal Navy
, a minesweeper of the Royal Netherlands Navy
 Gross-Basenach M IV, a pre-WWI German military semi-rigid airship
 Meusel M-IV, a German glider; see List of German gliders
 M.IV ("Matrix IV"), the fictional Warner Brothers videogame project inside the 2021 film The Matrix Resurrections

See also

 [[Nieuport IV|Nieuport IV]].M, a French pre-WWI monoplane
 Mitsubishi MiEV (/ˈmiːv/), the Mitsubishi innovative Electric Vehicle
 M4 (disambiguation)
 MI5 (disambiguation)
 MLV (disambiguation)
 1004 (disambiguation)